Louis Chollet (5 April 1815 – 21 March 1851) was a French organist and composer for piano, choir and orchestra.

Career
Born in Paris, Chollet was admitted to Pierre Zimmermann's piano class at the Conservatoire de Paris aged ten in 1826 and two years later won first prize for piano. In 1834, he succeeded Jean-Nicolas Marrigues as organist of the church of Saint-Thomas d'Aquin in Paris, holding it until his death and being succeeded there by Pierre-Edmond Hocmelle.

In 1837, he also won the first-ever second prize in the Prix de Rome competition. He completed his organ training under by François Benoist in 1838, winning first prize in organ that year.

Selected works

Piano
 Deux Petits duos pour piano à 4 mains
 Variations pour piano seul sur le thème du "Duc de Reichstadt"
 Fantaisie sur les thèmes de "Parisina" de Donizetti
 Rondo brillant
 Rondo sur la Romanesca

Choir
 Chanson napolitaine variée 
 Mélodie suisse variée

Orchestra
 Fantaisie sur le Domino noir 
 Variations brillantes sur des motifs du Lac des Fées 
 Fantaisie sur le Duc d'Olonne 
 Fantaisie sur la part du Diable

1815 births
1851 deaths
19th-century classical composers
19th-century French composers
19th-century French male musicians
Choral composers
Composers for piano
French classical organists
French male organists
Musicians from Paris
Male classical organists
19th-century organists